Athletics competitions at the 2006 Central American Games were held at the Estadio Olímpico del Instituto Nicaragüense de Juventud y Deporte in Managua, Nicaragua, between March 4-7, 2006.  

In total, 36 events were contested, 21 by men and 15 by women.  A report on
the results was given.

Records

5 games records were set, among them 2 in events that were
only held at this edition of the games.  In addition, 5 new national records
and 3 national junior records were set.

Medal summary

Results were published on the webpage of the Central American Isthmus Athletic Confederation (Spanish: Confederación Atlética del Istmo Centroamericano) CADICA and on the CACAC webpage.  Gold medal winners were also published elsewhere.

Men

Women

Medal table (unofficial)

Published medal counts slightly differ from
each other and from the unofficial medal count below.

References

Athletics at the Central American Games
International athletics competitions hosted by Nicaragua
Central American Games
2006 in Nicaraguan sport